The Dupont-Kalorama Museums Consortium was formed in 1983 to help promote the Washington, D.C. museums that are not located on the National Mall. Most of the museums are located in the historic Dupont Circle and Kalorama neighborhoods near Embassy Row and the group has grown from its original seven museums in the 1980s to its current total of nine. Among the group's most notable events is the free Museum Walk Weekend, held annually on the first full weekend in June.  For its work to promote its member museums, the Consortium was honored as a Member of the week by Cultural Tourism DC.

Members
The museums that comprise the consortium include the following:

 Anderson House
 Dumbarton House
 National Museum of American Jewish Military History
 The Phillips Collection
 Woodrow Wilson House

References

External links

Dupont Circle
Museums in Washington, D.C.
Organizations established in 1983
Organizations based in Washington, D.C.
1983 establishments in Washington, D.C.